The Leica TL is a digital mirrorless interchangeable lens camera announced by Leica Camera in November, 2016. It is the successor model of the Leica T (Typ 701). 

The camera uses L lens mount (previously known as the T mount).

References

External links 
 
 Leica TL review on dprevie.com June 09, 2017

Leica TL 
Cameras introduced in 2016